Armstrong Airport  is located  east southeast of Armstrong, Thunder Bay District, Ontario, Canada.

See also
Armstrong Water Aerodrome
Armstrong/Waweig Lake Water Aerodrome

External links
Page about this airport on COPA's Places to Fly airport directory

References

Registered aerodromes in Ontario
Transport in Thunder Bay District